Overmars is a surname. Notable people with the surname include:

Mark Overmars (born 1958), Dutch computer scientist and the creator of Game Maker
Marc Overmars (born 1973), Dutch football player

See also
Övermark

Dutch-language surnames